Katarzyna Agnieszka Ludwika z Sapiehów Sapieżyna (1718-1779), was a Polish noblewoman. She is foremost known for her political activity. She was a supporter and participant of the Bar Confederation (1768-1772).

References

18th-century Polish–Lithuanian politicians
18th-century Polish women
1718 births
1779 deaths
Katarzyna Agnieszka Ludwika
Bar confederates
18th-century women politicians